"Time Passages" is a 1978 US Top Ten hit song by singer-songwriter Al Stewart. It was produced by Alan Parsons and is the title track of Stewart's 1978 album release. The single reached No. 7 on the Billboard Hot 100 chart in December 1978, "Time Passages" also spent ten weeks at No. 1 on the U.S. Billboard Easy Listening chart, the longest stay at number one on this chart in the 1970s. Billboard magazine also ranked "Time Passages" as the No. 1 Adult Contemporary single of 1979.

The familiar final line to the chorus is, "Buy me a ticket on the last train home tonight". Less lyrically complex than a typical Al Stewart composition – the singer's previous Top Ten hit "Year of the Cat" exemplifying his usual style – "Time Passages" was one of two songs on the Time Passages album written by Stewart with the intent of the tracks' having hit single potential, the other being "Song on the Radio" which was the follow-up single and reached No. 29 Billboard and No. 27 Cash Box. The song describes the singer planning a trip home in late December (presumably for Christmas) and his nostalgic memories of the past.

Chart performance

Weekly charts

Year-end charts

See also
List of Billboard Easy Listening number ones of 1978

References

1978 singles
Al Stewart songs
Song recordings produced by Alan Parsons
1978 songs
Arista Records singles
Songs about nostalgia
1970s ballads
British soft rock songs